The krona (plural: kronor; sign: kr; code: SEK) is the official currency of the Kingdom of Sweden. Both the ISO code "SEK" and currency sign "kr" are in common use; the former precedes or follows the value, the latter usually follows it but, especially in the past, it sometimes preceded the value. In English, the currency is sometimes referred to as the Swedish crown, as  means "crown" in Swedish. The Swedish krona was the ninth-most traded currency in the world by value in April 2016.

One krona is subdivided into 100 öre (singular; plural öre or ören, where the former is always used after a cardinal number, hence "50 öre", but otherwise the latter is often preferred in contemporary speech). However, all öre coins were discontinued from 30 September 2010. Goods can still be priced in öre, but all sums are rounded to the nearest krona when paying with cash. The word öre is ultimately derived from the Latin word for gold (aurum).

History 
The introduction of the krona, which replaced at par the riksdaler, was a result of the Scandinavian Monetary Union, which came into effect in 1876 and lasted until the beginning of World War I. The parties to the union were the Scandinavian countries, where the name was krona in Sweden and krone in Denmark and Norway, which in English literally means "crown".

The mutual equivalence of all three currencies ended in World War I when their convertibility to gold was suspended. While their gold parities remained during most of the interwar period, these currencies have generally been quoted at varying market rates.

Coins

Contemporary 
On 11September 2012, the Riksbank announced a new series of coins with new sizes to replace the 1 and 5 krona coins which arrived in October 2016. The design of the coins follows the theme of singer-songwriter Ted Gärdestad's song, "Sol, vind och vatten" (English: "Sun, wind and water"), with the designs depicting the elements on the reverse side of the coins. This also included the reintroduction of the 2 krona coin, while the current 10 krona coin remained the same. The new coins also have a new portrait of the king in their design. One of the reasons for a new series of coins is to end the use of nickel (for allergy reasons). Vending machines and parking meters have to a fairly high degree stopped accepting coins and accept only bank cards or mobile phone payments.

History 

Between 1873 and 1876, coins in denominations of 1, 2, 5, 10, 25, and 50 öre and 1, 2, 10, and 20 kronor were introduced. The 1, 2 and 5 öre were in bronze, the 10-, 25-, 50-öre and 1-krona and 2-kronor were in silver, and the 10- and 20-kronor were in gold. Gold 5-kronor coins were added in 1881.

In 1873 the Scandinavian Monetary Union currency was fixed so that 2,480 kronor purchased 1 kg of gold. In 2017 the price of gold is 365,289 kronor per kg. So one öre in 1873 bought as much gold as 1.47 kronor in 2017. So if it is reasonable to have the smallest denomination coin 1 krona today, in 1873 a reasonable smallest denomination coin was 1 öre. A 10 kr gold coin weighed 4.4803 grams with 900 fineness so that the fine weight was 4.03327 grams or exactly 1/248th of a kilogram.

In 1902, production of gold coins ceased, and was briefly restarted in 1920 and 1925 before ceasing entirely. Due to metal shortages during World War I, iron replaced bronze between 1917 and 1919. Nickel-bronze replaced silver in the 10, 25 and 50 öre in 1920, with silver returning in 1927.

Metal shortages due to World War II again led to changes in the Swedish coinage. Between 1940 and 1947, the nickel-bronze 10, 25 and 50 öre were again issued. In 1942, iron again replaced bronze (until 1952) and the silver content of the other coins was reduced. In 1962, cupronickel replaced silver in the 10-öre, 25-öre and 50-öre coins.

In 1968, the 2-kronor switched to cupronickel and the 1-krona switched to cupronickel-clad copper (it was replaced entirely by cupronickel in 1982). Nonetheless, all previous mintages of the 1-krona (since 1875) and 2-kronor (since 1876) were still legal tender until 2017, though 2-kronor coins were extremely rarely seen in circulation as they have not been issued since 1971. The 2-kronor coins contained 40% silver until 1966, which meant they had been for several years worth much more than face value, so most have been bought and melted down by arbitrageurs, and the rest are kept by collectors.

In 1954, 1955 and 1971, 5-kronor silver coins were produced, with designs similar to contemporary 1-krona and 2-kronor coins. In 1972, a new, smaller 5-kronor coin was introduced, struck in cupronickel-clad nickel. The current design has been produced since 1976. 5-kronor coins minted since 1954 are legal tender but tend to be kept by collectors for their silver content.

The royal motto of the monarch is also inscribed on many of the coins. A new 5-kronor coin was designed in 1974, at a time when there were political efforts to abandon the monarchy and the young inexperienced king. The monarchy remained, but the 5-kronor was not given a portrait. Coins minted before 1974 have the same size, but contain the portrait of King Gustav VI Adolf and his royal motto.

Cash rounding (Swedish: öresavrundning), commonly called Swedish rounding, is a legally-enforced method of rounding off change, up or down, to the nearest unit of physical currency, while retaining the öre as pricing and accounting unit. It was required in conjunction with the phaseout of smaller coins, as follows:
 1971: 1- and 2-öre phased out; change rounded to nearest 5-öre.
 1984: 5- and 25-öre phased out; change rounded to nearest 10-öre.
 1991: 10-öre phased out; change rounded to nearest 50-öre.
 2010: 50-öre phased out; change rounded to nearest 1-krona.

In 1971 the 2-kronor coin ceased production. In 1972 the sizes of the 5-öre and 5-kronor coins were reduced.

In 1991, aluminium-brass ("Nordic gold") 10-kronor coins were introduced; previous 10-kronor coins are not legal tender. In the same year bronze-coloured 50-öre coins were introduced.

On 18December 2008, the Riksbank announced a proposal to phase out the 50-öre, the final öre coin, by 2010. The öre would still remain a subdivision unit for electronic payments. The reason could include low purchasing power, higher production and distribution cost than the value and the coins cannot be used in most parking machines and vending machines. On 25 March 2009, the Riksdag formally decided to enact the law to repeal 50-öre coins as legal tender. Under that law, the final date payments could be made with 50-öre coins was 30 September 2010. Remaining 50-öre coins could be exchanged at banks until the end of March 2011.

After the launch of the current coin series in 2016, all the old kronor coins became invalid since 2017. They cannot be used for payments, nor can they be exchanged for legal tender in any bank, and are instead instructed to be recycled as metal.

Jubilee and commemorative coins have been minted and those since 1897 or later are also legal tender.

Banknotes

Contemporary

History 

In 1874, notes were introduced by the Riksbank in denominations of 1 krona and 5, 10, 50, 100 and 1,000 kronor. The 1 krona was only initially issued for two years, although it reappeared between 1914 and 1920. In 1939 and 1958, 10,000 krona notes were issued.

Production of the 5 kronor note ceased in 1981, although a coin had been issued since 1972. With the introduction of a 10 krona coin in 1991, production of 10 krona notes ceased and a 20 kronor note was introduced.

All remaining one krona banknotes became invalid after 31 December 1987. All remaining five krona and ten krona banknotes became invalid after 31 December 1998.

An exhaustive list of every banknote design since 1874 is not included, but the following five designs were or will be retired in 2016–2017. The oldest design began to be printed in 1985.

A 20 krona banknote (a new denomination) was printed 1991–1995 with a portrait of the writer Selma Lagerlöf and on the reverse was an engraved interpretation of a passage from the book The Wonderful Adventures of Nils. The banknote became invalid after 31 December 2005. A more secure version with the same portrait was printed from 1997 to 2008 and became invalid after 30 June 2016.

A 50 krona banknote (3rd design since 1896) was printed 1996–2003 with a portrait of the singer Jenny Lind and on the reverse was a picture of a silver harp and its tonal range. The banknote became invalid after 31 December 2013. A more secure version with the same portrait was printed from 2006 to 2011 and became invalid after 30 June 2016.

A 100 krona banknote (3rd design since 1898) was printed 1986–2000 with a portrait of the botanist Carl Linnaeus and on the reverse was a drawing of a bee pollinating a flower. The banknote became invalid after 31 December 2005. A more secure version with the same portrait was introduced in 2001 and became invalid after 30 June 2017.

A 500 krona banknote (a new denomination) in a blue shade was introduced in 1985 with a portrait of King Charles XI and on the reverse an engraving depicts Christopher Polhem, the "father of Swedish engineering". These banknotes became invalid on 31 December 1998. A 500 krona banknote (red, but without foil strips) with the same portrait was printed 1989–2000. This banknote became invalid after 31 December 2005. A more secure version with the same portrait was introduced in 2001 and became invalid after 30 June 2017. The banknote had some controversy in 1985 because of the executions of "Snapphane" guerrilla warriors that King Charles XI ordered.

The first two designs of 1,000 krona banknotes (printed from 1894 to 1950 and 1952–1973) became invalid on 31 December 1987. The third design with portrait of Jöns Jacob Berzelius (printed 1976–1988) and declared invalid on 31 December 1998. In preparation for retirement of the 10,000 krona banknotes a new 1,000 krona banknotes (of the 4th design / without foil strips) was printed from 1989 to 1991 with a portrait of Gustav Vasa and on the reverse a harvest picture from Olaus Magnus's Description of the Northern Peoples from 1555. Circulation peaked at over 48 million in 2001.

On 15 March 2006, the Riksbank introduced a new, more secure 1,000 krona banknote with the same portrait and the Riksbank became the first central bank in the world to use the security feature of MOTION (a moving image in the striped band) on the new 1,000 krona banknote. When the banknote is tilted, the picture in the striped band appears to move. The Vasa banknote without security thread became invalid after 31 December 2013 at which time there was only 10 million in circulation. The Vasa banknotes with the security thread became invalid after 30 June 2016 at which time there was under 4 million in circulation. Replacement banknotes featuring Dag Hammarskjöld became valid on 1 October 2015, but were circulated in considerably fewer quantities (less than 3.5 million), thus reducing the supply of cash in Sweden.

The 10,000 krona banknote was always printed in small quantities as it was one of the most valuable banknotes in the world. The first design featuring the Head of Mercury was printed in 1939 and became invalid after 31 December 1987. The second design was printed 1958 and featured a portrait of Gustav VI Adolf, and became invalid after 31 December 1991.

Invalid banknotes can be redeemed via the Riksbank, with an administration fee of 200 kronor.

2015 series 

On 6April 2011, the Riksbank announced the names of the persons whose portraits would decorate the new series of banknotes that would be introduced in 2015. This would also include a new 200-krona banknote. These are:

Astrid Lindgren on the 20-krona banknote; Purple
Evert Taube on the 50-krona banknote; Orange
Greta Garbo on the 100-krona banknote; Blue
Ingmar Bergman on the 200-krona banknote; Green
Birgit Nilsson on the 500-krona banknote; Red
Dag Hammarskjöld on the 1,000-krona banknote; Brown

On 24April 2012, the Riksbank announced the base for the new designs of the banknotes, based on Göran Österlund's entry titled Cultural Journey.

The first banknotes, the 20, 50, 200, and 1,000 krona, were issued on 1 October 2015 with the other two notes, the 100 and 500 krona, to follow on 3October 2016.

500 kr banknote controversy 

Opera singer Malena Ernman has criticized the Riksbank for choosing a design where Birgit Nilsson has been depicted performing Die Walküre by Richard Wagner. She pointed out that it was very inappropriate to include something by Wagner, whose works were associated with Nazi Germany, in a time of increasing problems with antisemitism in Sweden. Wagner died long before the Nazi era, and the association is that Hitler liked his music. The Riksbank replied saying that it is "unfortunate that the choice of design is seen as negative", and stated that it is not going to be changed.

Dagens Nyheter journalist Björn Wiman went further in his criticism, condemning the Riksbank for selecting Nilsson at all for the 500-krona banknote. He brings up an example from Nilsson's 1995 autobiography, where she described Mauritz Rosengarten from Decca using antisemitic jokes about greed.

Exchange rate 

To see where Swedish krona ranks in "most traded currencies", read the article on the Foreign exchange market.

The exchange rate of the Swedish krona against other currencies has historically been dependent on the monetary policy pursued by Sweden at the time. Since the Swedish banking rescue, a managed float regimen has been upheld.

The weakest the krona has been relative to the euro was 6 March 2009 when one euro bought 11.6465 SEK. The strongest the krona has been relative to the euro was on 13 August 2012 when one euro bought 8.2065 SEK. The weakness in the euro was due to the crisis in Greece which began in July 2012 and fear of further spreading to Italy and Spain. The average exchange rate since the beginning of 2002 when the euro banknote and coins were issued and 1 March 2017 was 9.2884 SEK/EUR.

Relationship to the euro 

According to the 1994 accession treaty (effective 1 January 1995), Sweden is required to join the eurozone and therefore must convert to the euro once the convergence criteria are met. Notwithstanding this, on 14 September 2003, a consultative Swedish referendum was held on the euro, in which 56% of voters were opposed to the adoption of the currency, out of an overall turnout of 82.6%. The Swedish government has argued such a course of action is possible since one of the requirements for eurozone membership is a prior two-year membership of the ERM II. By simply not joining the exchange rate mechanism, the Swedish government is provided a formal loophole avoiding the theoretical requirement of adopting the euro.

Some of Sweden's major parties continue to believe it would be in the national interest to join, but all parties have pledged to abide by the results of the referendum, and none have shown any interest in raising the issue again. There was an agreement among the parties not to discuss the issue before the 2010 general election. In a poll from May 2007, 33.3% were in favour, while 53.8% were against and 13.0% were uncertain.

In February 2009, Fredrik Reinfeldt, the Prime Minister of Sweden, stated that a new referendum on the euro issue will not be held until support is gained from the people and all the major parties. Therefore, the timing is now at the discretion of the Social Democrats. He added, the request of Mona Sahlin, former leader of the Social Democratic Party, for deferral of a new referendum until after the 2010 mandate period should be respected.

, support for Swedish membership of the euro among the general population is low. In September 2013, support fell as low as 9%. The only party in the Riksdag that supports Swedish entry in the euro (as of 2015) is the centrist Liberal Party.

Banknotes and coins per capita in circulation 
Sweden is a wealthy country and in the 1970s and 1980s the value of banknotes and coins per capita was one of the highest in the world. In 1991, the largest banknote worth 10,000kr that was in circulation since 1958 was declared invalid and no longer was legal tender. For a discussion of the financial and banking crisis that hit Sweden in the early 1990s see the article History of Sweden (1991–present) and Swedish banking rescue.

Unlike the United States, which by policy never declares issued money invalid, Sweden and most other European countries have a date when older series of banknotes or older coin designs are invalid and are no longer legal tender. From the years 2001 to 2008 banknotes and coins were circulated at a near constant level of around 12,000 krona per capita, but in 2006 a modified 1,000-krona banknote with a motion security strip was produced. Within seven years the banknotes without the strip were declared invalid, leaving only a radically reduced number of banknotes with foil valid. The Vasa 1,000-krona banknote without the foil strip became invalid after 31 December 2013, and the pieces with the foil strip are invalid after 30 June 2016. Also the Swish mobile payment system was established in Sweden in 2012 and become a popular alternative to cash payments.

Although many countries are performing larger and larger share of transactions by electronic means, Sweden is unique in that it is also reducing its cash in circulation by a significant percentage. According to Bank for International Settlements the last year Sweden was surpassed in cash on a per capita basis converted to United States dollars by USA in 1993, the Euro Area in 2003, Australia in 2007, Canada in 2009, United Kingdom and Saudi Arabia in 2013, South Korea in 2014, Russia in 2016, and Mexico in 2019. As of 2019 Sweden is still circulating more cash per person (converted to USD) than Argentina, Brazil, Turkey, India, Indonesia, and South Africa.

The tables show the value of the banknotes and coins per capita for participating countries on Committee on Payments and Market Infrastructures (CPMI). Local currency is converted to US dollars using end of the year rates.

The circulation levels in the table above were reported to the Bank for International Settlements. Possible discrepancies with these statistics and other sources may be because some sources exclude "commemorative banknotes and coins" (3.20% of total for Sweden in 2015) and other sources exclude "banknotes and coin held by banks" (2.68% of total for Sweden in 2015) as opposed "banknotes and coin in circulation outside banks".

Circulation levels of cash on a per capita basis, are reduced by 51% from the high in 2007 compared to 2018. Speculation about Sweden declaring all banknotes and coins invalid at some future date is widespread in the media with Björn Ulvaeus as a celebrity advocate of a cashless Sweden which he believes will result in a safer society because simple robbery will involve stealing goods that must be fenced.

The value of the payments between households, companies and authorities in Sweden amounts to about 20,000 kronor annual per capita in cash. In shops, almost one in seven payments is made in cash. More than half of the adult population has the Swish payment app. Annual withdrawals from Swedish ATMs in 2015 amount to 15,300 kronor per capita. According to Skingsley, "what some consumers, smaller companies and local clubs often see as a problem, is not so much getting hold of cash, but being able to deposit it in a bank account."

To see how circulation of the Swedish krona ranks compared to other currencies see Bank for International Settlements#Red Books.

The e-krona 

The e-krona (electronic krona) is a proposed electronic currency to be issued directly by the Riksbank. It is different from the electronic transfers using commercial bank money as central bank money has no nominal credit risk, as it stands for a claim on the central bank, which cannot go bankrupt, at least not for debts in Swedish krona.

The declining use of cash in Sweden is going to be reinforced cyclically. As more businesses find that they can function without accepting cash, the number of businesses refusing to accept cash will increase. That will re-enforce the need for more and more citizens to get the Swish app which is already used by half the population. Cash machines, which are controlled by a Swedish bank consortium, are being dismantled by the hundreds, especially in rural areas.

The Riksbank has not taken a decision on issuing e-krona. First, the Riksbank needs to investigate a number of technical, legal and practical issues. "The declining use of cash in Sweden means that this is more of a burning issue for us than for most other central banks. Although it may appear simple at first glance to issue e-krona, this is something entirely new for a central bank and there is no precedent to follow". If the Riksbank chooses to issue e-krona, it is not to replace cash, but to act as a complement to it. "The Riksbank will continue issuing banknotes and coins as long as there is demand for them in society. It is our statutory duty and we will of course continue to live up to it," concluded Deputy Governor Cecilia Skingsley.

In December 2020, Sweden's Minister for Financial Markets Per Bolund announced a government review to explore the feasibility of moving to a digital currency that was expected to be completed by the end of November in 2022. Anna Kinberg Batra, a former chairwoman of the Riksbank's finance committee, was announced as the leader of the review. As of 2023, no decision has been made.

See also 

 Cash rounding
 Economy of Sweden
 Fyrk
 Monetary policy of Sweden
 Scandinavian Monetary Union
 Sweden and the euro
 Swedish National Debt Office
 Tables of historical exchange rates to the United States dollar

References

Further reading

External links 
 Sveriges Riksbank 
 Swedish monetary standards in historical perspective
 Historical and current banknotes of Sweden 

1873 establishments in Sweden
Currencies introduced in 1873
Currencies of Sweden
Euroscepticism in Sweden